Ivan Keats (16 April 1937 – 27 August 2020) was a New Zealand long-distance runner. He competed in the marathon at the 1964 Summer Olympics.

References

External links
 

1937 births
2020 deaths
Athletes (track and field) at the 1964 Summer Olympics
New Zealand male long-distance runners
New Zealand male marathon runners
Olympic athletes of New Zealand
Athletes from Christchurch